Andrew Charles O'Dell FRSE FRGS FRSGS (1909–1966) was a Scottish geographer and antiquarian. A keen railway enthusiast he left a large collection of railway memorabilia to Aberdeen University, known as the O'Dell Collection. He was joint founder of the Institute of British Geographers in 1933.

He was best known to the general public for his involvement in the discovery of the St Ninian's Isle Treasure in Shetland, in 1959.

Life
He was born on 4 June 1909 in Luipardsvlei in the Transvaal Colony, the son of Charles O'Dell. His mother was from the Scottish Borders. He was educated at Westminster City School in London. He then studied Geography at Kings College University of London. From 1945 he was Head of the Department Geography at Aberdeen University.

In 1951 he was elected a Fellow of the Royal Society of Edinburgh. His proposers were Alan Grant Ogilvie, John Baird Simpson, James Robert Matthews and Henry Marshall Steven.

He died suddenly on 17 June 1966.

Family
In 1938 he married Queenie Louise Smith.

Publications
 The Scandinavian World (1958)
Geography: Our Earth and Its Peoples (1967)
Railways and Geography (1971)
The Railways of Scotland

References

1909 births
1966 deaths
Scottish geographers
Alumni of the University of London
Academics of the University of Aberdeen
Scottish non-fiction writers
Fellows of the Royal Society of Edinburgh
Transvaal Colony people
Scottish people of the British Empire
Railway historians
Scottish antiquarians
People associated with the University of Aberdeen
People educated at Westminster School, London
Historians of Scotland
20th-century geographers
20th-century antiquarians